Nenjirukkum Varai is a 2006 Indian Tamil-language romantic drama film directed by S. A. Chandrasekhar. The film stars Narain and newcomer Deepa, while Mahadevan, Thalaivasal Vijay, Kalairani, Nassar, and Livingston play supporting roles. The music was composed by Srikanth Deva with cinematography by M. Jeevan and editing by J. N. Harsha. The film was released on 15 December 2006 and was a commercial success.

Plot
Ganesh is a slum boy who drives an auto to support his family. Bhuvana is the neglected daughter of a rich man and is in search of true love. Bhuvana is drawn to Ganesh's honesty and good heart. She confesses her love to Ganesh, but he turns her away, saying that a rich girl like her would never be able to live a life of poverty with him. Bhuvana tells Ganesh that she will show him that she can do it and comes to his house with just the clothes on herself. As Bhuvana and Ganesh share a happy love and understanding, life is all roses until a storm disrupts their happiness. Bhuvana meets with an accident and fights for her life. The doctors say that nothing but a heart transplant could save her. Ganesh has no money for the operation and is unable to bear the thought of a life without Bhuvana.

Ganesh collects about two lakhs out of three, which is not accepted in the hospital counter. He approaches the hospital MD in his VIP party and causes a ruckus. He gets arrested and is detained in a room. He becomes frustrated, holds the emergency room hostage, and threatens to blow up the 40 people inside. The hostages include the cardiologist who refused to operate on his lover, a minister hiding from journalists, a child suffering from blood leukaemia, an old couple, and a young couple. An accident emergency case occurs, and he opens the emergency room for treatment. The hostages began to doubt his threats. Police rescue fails, and they end up conceding to his demand and operating on Bhuvana. The hostages grow sympathetic to Ganesh's cause and help him and pray for him.

The commissioner tries to get even for getting slapped by Ganesh during one of the hostage talks. The commissioner pretends to be an injured victim and enters into the room. The hostages refuse to move out of the room even as Ganesh gets apprehended by the commissioner. Though the hospital had agreed to operate on Bhuvana, no hospital seem to have a matching heart to perform a heart transplant. This is when Ganesh is determined to give her his own heart. He cuts his hand to send for a blood group, and it matches to Bhuvana’s blood group. The doctor refuses to accept the heart of a living person, stating that it is illegal. Ganesh decides to kill himself and sacrifice his life for hers. All the hostages persuade him to find some other way. Ganesh talks to Bhuvana one last time and then commits suicide, thereby giving his heart to Bhuvana.

Cast

 Narain as Ganesh
 Deepa as Bhuvana
 Mahadevan as Rangasamy Naidu, Bhuvana's father
 Thalaivasal Vijay as Ganesh's father
 Kalairani as Ganesh's mother
 Nassar as Doctor
 Livingston as Gandhi
 Ganja Karuppu as Auto Driver
 Sriman as Hospital MD
 Subbaraju as Police Officer
 Sanjeev as Sanjeev
 Charle as man with broken arm
 Aarthi
 Master Mahendran
 Rekha Vedavyas (Special appearance)
 Seema (Special appearance)

Soundtrack
Soundtrack was composed by Srikanth Deva. The song "Azhagana Ponnuthan" borrows its opening line from the song of the same name from Alibabavum 40 Thirudargalum (1956). Rediff wrote that "If you can forget the remix of old hits, this is not a bad album".

Release 
Nenjirukkum Varai's was initially blocked by the Madras High Court after a petition filed by Aby Kunjumon, alleging the climax plagiarised his script Swasam, which he registered with the South India Story Writers Association in 2000.

References

External links
 

2006 films
2000s Tamil-language films
Films scored by Srikanth Deva
Indian romantic drama films
Films about hostage takings
Films set in hospitals
Films directed by S. A. Chandrasekhar
2006 romantic drama films
Films involved in plagiarism controversies